The Princess is a beauty pageant in Japan that selects the contestant to represent each district at this beauty pageant. It started in 2007, and is held annually throughout Japan.

References

Official website
 ミスコンテスト | プリンセス | アナウンサー・モデル・タレントの登竜門（公式ウェブサイト）
 ミスコンテスト｜プリンセス（Facebook officialpage）

Beauty pageants in Japan